Robert Marlin Maddoux (May 4, 1933 – March 4, 2004) was an American pioneer in broadcasting. Maddoux was the host of Point of View radio talk show, the founder and president of the USA Radio Network and the National Center for Freedom & Renewal (formerly International Christian Media), Alliance Defense Fund co-founder as well as a noted journalist and author.

Career
Maddoux was founder and host of Point of View radio talk show, which began in 1972 and is broadcast daily via satellite on 250 radio stations nationwide and around the world by shortwave. He was a pioneer in the talk radio industry with Point of View’s hard-hitting issues-oriented talk format. For more than thirty years, Point of View has covered the full spectrum of issues and current events that affect homes, beliefs, schools, government, churches and basic freedoms from a Christian perspective. In 1986, Maddoux received the National Religious Broadcasters Award of Merit. In 1994, Christianity Today magazine called Point of View America's "most popular live Christian call-in show."

In 1985, Maddoux founded USA Radio Network.  In 1994, the National Religious Broadcasters awarded the USA Radio Network its "Program Producer of the Year" Award. Marlin Maddoux was inducted into the National Religious Broadcasters Hall of Fame in 2007.

Books
He is the author of several nonfiction books and one novel.

Nonfiction

 
 

 
 (published posthumously)

Novels

References

External links
 

1933 births
2004 deaths
Alliance Defending Freedom people
American talk radio hosts